Sunheung is a township administered as part of the municipality of Yeongju in North Gyeongsang, South Korea. Located in Sunheung is Sosu Seowon, a Neo-Confucian Academy built in the 16th century, today a UNESCO World Heritage Site.

Name
Sunheung is an anglicization of the McCune–Reischauer romanization Sunhŭng. Its official romanization in South Korea is Sunheung. In 19th century sources, Sunheung appears as Sioun-heng-fu, from a French transcription of the Korean placename and the Chinese pronunciation of its status as the seat of a district or commandery. Although the name literally means "Adhering to", "Obeying", or "Following Prosperity" or "Success", Sunheung is also Bon-gwan of a Korean clan in the area which included the influential Korean Confucianist An Hyang.

History
Under the late Joseon dynasty, Sunheung was a district capital overseeing the plains and hinterland around Mount Taebaek. Its mountains were the site of Korea's first foreign mining concern, a silver mine whose permit was revoked by the royal court in Seoul after a few months of operation in the early 1850s.

See also
 List of South Korean townships
 Ahn (Korean surname)#Sunheung Clan (Dominant Clan)

References

Citations

Bibliography
 .
 .

External links
 "Old Korea, Pt. I", a partial English translation of Dallet's History of the Korean Church at Lotus & Persimmon

Towns and townships in North Gyeongsang Province
Yeongju